Hengill (Icelandic, pronounced ) is a volcanic mountain range situated in the southwest of Iceland, to the south of Þingvellir. The mountain range covers an area of about 100 km².

The volcano is still active, evidenced by its numerous hot springs and fumaroles, but the last eruption occurred approximately 2,000 years ago, before the settlement of Iceland.

The volcano is an important source of energy for the south of the country, which is captured at the Nesjavellir power station (near the western shore of the lake Þingvallavatn) and the Hellisheiði power station (approximately 11 km southwest of Nesjavellir).  Both stations are operated by Orkuveita Reykjavíkur (Reykjavik Energy).

The area with its mountains and hot springs is well suited for hiking and there are a lot of hiking trails.
The town of Hveragerði with its multitude of hot springs is also part of the Hengill area.

Some folk tales and sagas are connected to the region. For example, a young farmer is said to have killed the sleeping troll woman Jóra  while she lay in wait for innocent wanderers or horsemen on the trail over Dyrafjöll .

See also
 Geography of Iceland
 List of lakes of Iceland
 Volcanism of Iceland
 List of volcanic eruptions on Iceland''

References

External links 
 Hengill in the Catalogue of Icelandic Volcanoes
  Map

Active volcanoes
Fissure vents
West Volcanic Zone of Iceland
Mountains of Iceland
Polygenetic shield volcanoes
Volcanoes of Iceland
Volcanic systems of Iceland
Reykjanes Volcanic Belt